is a 1964 black-and-white Japanese film drama directed by Mikio Naruse, starring Hideko Takamine and Yūzō Kayama. The film is based on a story by Naruse, with the screenplay authored by Zenzo Matsuyama.

The story centers on war-widow Reiko Morita (Hideko Takamine), who has given her best years to her late husband's family while managing their grocery. The family plots to tear down the shop and build a supermarket in its place, pushing Reiko out of the top position. As with many Naruse films, the background to the film marks a significant point of social change, in this case the arrival of modern supermarkets with their inevitable effect of driving local family grocery stores out of business.

Plot
Reiko Morita (Hideko Takamine) is a widow who loses her husband in the war. Bombing destroys his family's shop, and his widow stays to rebuild it as the rest of the family flee.  She runs the shop for 18 years out of love for her dead husband and his mother. The film starts 18 years later, when a new supermarket threatens to put them out of business. Reiko's sisters-in-law conspire to turn the shop into a supermarket and get rid of their brother's widow. Meanwhile, the surviving younger brother-in-law, 25-year-old Koji Morita (Yūzō Kayama, loafs around, losing jobs, getting drunk, getting laid and gambling. In the crisis, he confesses to his shocked sister-in-law, 12 years older, that he has always loved her and can't deal with it. She cares for him, but in a motherly, elder sisterly way. She rejects him and decides to return home to her family, threatening suicide if he stops her. This suits the sisters, but he follows her onto the long train ride. On the way, she softens and they disembark for a country inn, where they can talk. He resumes his approaches, but at the last minute, she can't face intimacy. He storms out and gets drunk. He calls Reiko up and says he is going back home. In the morning, Reiko looks out the window and sees him being carried into the village on a stretcher, his face covered. Someone says he fell from a cliff. Reiko runs after him but falters. The last shot is of her blank face as she realizes what happened.

Cast
 Hideko Takamine as Reiko Morita
 Yūzō Kayama as Koji Morita
 Mitsuko Kusabue as Hisako Morizono
 Yumi Shirakawa as Takako Morita
 Mie Hama as Ruriko
 Kazuo Kitamura as Morizono
 Aiko Mimasu as Shizu Morita
 Chieko Nakakita as Mrs. Kaga

Awards 
 1964 - Locarno International Film Festival - Silver Sail Award for Best Actress : Hideko Takamine

References

External links
Yearning at Japan Movie Database
 

1964 drama films
1964 films
Japanese black-and-white films
Japanese drama films
1960s Japanese-language films
Toho films
Films directed by Mikio Naruse
Films produced by Sanezumi Fujimoto
Films scored by Ichirō Saitō
1960s Japanese films